The 2019 Trans-Am Series season was the 51st running of the Sports Car Club of America's Trans Am Series. It began on March 1 and ran for twelve rounds.

Schedule

National Championship

West Coast Championship

Changes
Homestead Miami Speedway and Pittsburgh International Race Complex have been dropped.
Laguna Seca and Lime Rock are new to the schedule.

Race results

National Championship 
TA, SGT, GT competed together at all events. TA2 competed in a dedicated race at all events. Overall winners in bold.

West Coast Championship 
All classes raced together on track, except in the meetings shared with the National Championship. Bold indicates overall winner.

Footnotes

References

Trans-Am Series